Live in Tokyo is a 1983 live album released by Public Image Ltd as a 2-EP 45 RPM set. It was issued by Columbia Records in Japan and later reissued by Virgin Records in the UK and reached #28 on the British charts. A single-LP 33 RPM edition was later issued by Elektra Records in the US.

A 35-minute live videocassette from the same series of concerts was also issued by Columbia Records in Japan under the title Live '83.

Live in Tokyo was the world's first digitally recorded live album according to Martin Atkins and the band recorded the concerts specifically to use the new Japanese digital technology

Track listing
Side One
 "Annalisa" – 5:17
 "Religion II" – 5:49

Side Two
 "Low-Life" – 2:47
 "Solitaire" – 3:59
 "Flowers of Romance" – 4:46

Side Three 
 "This Is Not a Love Song" – 6:27
 "Swan Lake" – 5:06

Side Four
 "Bad Life" – 4:44
 "Banging the Door" – 4:55
 "Under the House" – 1:56

Personnel
Public Image Limited
John Lydon - vocals
Joseph Guida - guitar
Louis Bernardi - bass
Tommy Zvoncheck - keyboards
Martin Atkins - drums
Technical
Kenji Miura - cover photograph

Charts

References 

Public Image Ltd albums
1983 live albums
Virgin Records live albums
Albums recorded at Nakano Sun Plaza